Certeju de Sus is a commune in Hunedoara County, Transylvania, Romania. It is composed of nine villages: Bocșa Mare (Boksatelep), Bocșa Mică, Certeju de Sus, Hondol (Hondol), Măgura-Toplița (Magura), Nojag (Nozság), Săcărâmb (Nagyág; Gross-Astdorf), Toplița Mureșului (Toplica) and Vărmaga (Vormága).

The commune is the site of the Certej Mine and of the 1971 Certej dam failure.

Natives
 Ioan Moța

References

Communes in Hunedoara County
Localities in Transylvania
Certeju